Forrest Eugene Everhart Sr. (August 28, 1922 – August 30, 1986) was a United States Army soldier and a recipient of the United States military's highest decoration—the Medal of Honor—for his actions in World War II.

Biography
Everhart joined the Army from Texas City, Texas in 1940, and by November 12, 1944, was serving as a technical sergeant in Company H, 359th Infantry Regiment, 90th Infantry Division. On that day, near Kerling, France, he led his platoon in a defense against a counterattack by a numerically superior German force. When German soldiers threatened to overrun his platoon's machine gun positions, he twice engaged them alone and drove them away. For these actions, he was awarded the Medal of Honor ten months later, on September 10, 1945.

Everhart left the Army while still a technical sergeant. He died at age 64 and was buried in Arlington National Cemetery, Arlington County, Virginia.

Medal of Honor citation
Technical Sergeant Everhart's official Medal of Honor citation reads:
He commanded a platoon that bore the brunt of a desperate enemy counterattack near Korling, France, before dawn on 12 November 1944. When German tanks and self-propelled guns penetrated his left flank and overwhelming infantry forces threatened to overrun the 1 remaining machinegun in that section, he ran 400 yards through woods churned by artillery and mortar concentrations to strengthen the defense. With the 1 remaining gunner, he directed furious fire into the advancing hordes until they swarmed close to the position. He left the gun, boldly charged the attackers and, after a 15-minute exchange of hand grenades, forced them to withdraw leaving 30 dead behind. He re-crossed the fire-swept terrain to his then threatened right flank, exhorted his men and directed murderous fire from the single machinegun at that position. There, in the light of bursting mortar shells, he again closed with the enemy in a hand grenade duel and, after a fierce 30-minute battle, forced the Germans to withdraw leaving another 20 dead. The gallantry and intrepidity of T/Sgt. Everhart in rallying his men and refusing to fall back in the face of terrible odds were highly instrumental in repelling the fanatical enemy counterattack directed at the American bridgehead across the Moselle River.

See also

List of Medal of Honor recipients
List of Medal of Honor recipients for World War II

References

Texas State Cemetery

1922 births
1986 deaths
United States Army personnel of World War II
United States Army Medal of Honor recipients
Burials at Arlington National Cemetery
United States Army soldiers
World War II recipients of the Medal of Honor
People from Bainbridge, Ross County, Ohio